Saraswati Singh is an Indian politician and a member of the Indian National Congress party.

Career

Political career
She became an MLA in 2013.

References

See also
Twitter Account

Madhya Pradesh Legislative Assembly
2013 Madhya Pradesh Legislative Assembly election

1980 births
Living people
Indian National Congress politicians from Madhya Pradesh
Madhya Pradesh MLAs 2013–2018
21st-century Indian women politicians
21st-century Indian politicians
People from Singrauli district
Women members of the Madhya Pradesh Legislative Assembly